The Chiang Mai dwarf gecko (Hemiphyllodactylus chiangmaiensis) is a species of gecko endemic to Chiang Mai Province of Thailand.

References

Hemiphyllodactylus
Geckos of Thailand
Reptiles described in 2014
Endemic fauna of Thailand